Ukrainian records in 100 metres are now ratified by the Ukrainian Athletic Federation among the results achieved by Ukrainian athletes on track.

Progression 

The first Ukrainian national record, which is known to be ratified, dates back to 1921. Up until 1977, the national governing body ratified only hand-timed results as records. Starting from 1977 (the year of introducing the mandatory automatic time measurement in sprint events), Ukrainian governing body in athletics started keeping the auto-timed national records in 100 metres. It was the result of Valeriy Borzov (10.07), his winning time in the 1972 Olympics' quarterfinal, to become the first and remaining the only auto-timed national record in the history of Ukrainian athletics. The hand-timed national records in the same event continued to be kept in parallel up until the end of 2003.

Hand timing

Automated timing

See also 

 List of Ukrainian records in athletics

References

External links 

 
 

Ukrainian records in athletics
Ukrainian athletics record progressions